Ștefan Stoica may refer to:

Ștefan Stoica (footballer) (born 1967), former football midfielder and current manager
Ștefan Stoica (politician) (1976–2014), Romanian politician